Cracker, crackers or The Crackers may refer to:

Animals
 Hamadryas (butterfly), or crackers, a genus of brush-footed butterflies
 Sparodon, a monotypic genus whose species is sometimes known as "Cracker"

Arts and entertainment

Films
 Crackers (1984 film), an American film starring Sean Penn
 Crackers (1998 film), an Australian film
 Crackers (2011 film), a Bollywood film

Music
 Cracker (band), an American rock band
 Cracker (album), the debut studio album by the American rock band Cracker, released on March 10, 1992
 Crackers (song), a 1980 song by Barbara Mandrell
 Crackers: The Christmas Party Album, an album by the British glam rock band Slade
 The Crackers, a 1968 pseudonym of the band The Merseybeats

Television
 Cracker (British TV series), a television crime drama series
 Cracker (U.S. TV series), the U.S. remake of the British television series

Other uses in arts and entertainment
 Crackers (Captain Underpants), a comic book character
 Cracker (comic), a British children's comic

People
 Cracker (term), a racial epithet, commonly a derogatory term for any person of white European descent
 Computer cracker, a security hacker who maliciously exploits weaknesses in a computer or network
 Software cracker, a person who uses reverse engineering to remove software copy protections
 Safecracker, a person who breaks open safes, usually to rob them
 Georgia cracker, 19th–20th century cattle drivers of the Georgia plains
 Florida cracker, 19th–20th century cattle drivers of the Florida scrub regions
 Miz Cracker, American drag queen

Places
 Cracker, a mountain peak in Glacier National Park (U.S.), Montana
 Cracker (benchmark), its benchmark summit

Other uses
 Cracker (food), a type of biscuit, usually salted or savoury
 Cracker, an petrochemical industry component used for cracking
 Christmas cracker, a traditional British Christmas toy or decoration
 Operation Crackers,  a British Commando raid during the Second World War
 Atlanta Crackers, an American baseball team from Atlanta, Georgia
 "The Cracker," a railroad train of the Southern Railway operating from Atlanta to Valdosta
 Cracker, a length of twine or string at the end of a whip that produces a cracking sound
 Firecracker, commonly shortened to "cracker" in Indian English

See also
 Atlanta Black Crackers, a professional baseball team which played in the Negro leagues
 Cracking (disambiguation)
 Craker, a surname